The 2018–19 Coupe de France preliminary rounds, Auvergne-Rhône-Alpes was the qualifying competition to decide which teams from the leagues of the Auvergne-Rhône-Alpes region of France took part in the main competition from the seventh round.

First round 
These matches were  played on 25 and 26 August 2018.

Second round 
These matches were played on 1 and 2 September 2018.

Third round 
These matches were played on 15 and 16 September 2018.

Fourth round 
These matches were played on 29 and 30 September 2018.

Fifth round 
These matches were played on 13 and 14 October 2018.

Sixth round 
These matches were played on 27 and 28 October 2018.

References 

2018–19 Coupe de France